The 2018 Junior Men's French Pacific Handball Championship was held in L'Arene du Sud, New Caledonia, New Caledonia on 14 June 2018 during the 2018 Oceania Men's Handball Challenge Trophy.

The competition participants Tahiti, and New Caledonia. Wallis and Futuna did not send a team.

The winners were Tahiti over New Caledonia.

Results

Rankings

References

 Review of U18 & U20 Championships. IHF webpage
 https://www.lnc.nc/article/sports/aux-oceania-les-cagous-aurontla-revanche-dans-la-peau La Nouvelles Calledoniennes (french)
 Faire le lien entre l’ancienne et la nouvelle génération La Nouvelles Calledoniennes (french)
 U20 : les Tahitiens trop forts pour les Cagous. La Nouvelles Calledoniennes (french)

French Pacific Junior Men's Handball Cup
Pacific Handball Cup